Thompson Creek is a stream in Pierce and Thurston counties in the U.S. state of Washington. It is a tributary to the Nisqually River. Its source is in Pierce County and its mouth is in Thurston County.

The namesake of Thompson Creek has not been identified.

References

Rivers of Pierce County, Washington
Rivers of Thurston County, Washington
Rivers of Washington (state)